Gender dysphoria in children (GD), also known as gender incongruence of childhood,  is a formal diagnosis for children who experience significant discontent (gender dysphoria) due to a mismatch between their assigned sex and gender identity. The diagnostic label gender identity disorder in children (GIDC) was used by the Diagnostic and Statistical Manual of Mental Disorders (DSM) until it was renamed gender dysphoria in children in 2013 with the release of the DSM-5. The diagnosis was renamed to remove the stigma associated with the term disorder.

Controversy surrounding the pathologization and treatment of a transgender identity and associated behaviors, particularly in children, has been evident in the literature since the 1980s. The majority of major medical associations such as the American Psychological Association, Substance Abuse and Mental Health Services Administration, and the World Professional Association for Transgender Health consider attempts to change a person's gender identity to be conversion therapy. The practice is considered unethical, pathologizing, and seriously harmful to transgender youth. Researchers also argue that therapeutic interventions that aim to alter a child's gender identity rely on the assumption that an adult transgender identity is undesirable, challenging this assumption along with the lack of clinical data to support outcomes and efficacy.
 
Proponents of the older therapeutic approach to intervention argue that therapeutic intervention helps children be more comfortable in their bodies, have better peer relations and therefore better self-esteem, that research indicates there exist forms of distress associated directly with children's gender variance, and that treatment can prevent adult GD. More modern therapeutic interventions do not seek to change a child's gender identity, but are instead focused on creating a supportive and safe environment for the child to explore their gender identity and gender expression.

Classification

Children with persistent gender dysphoria are characterized by more extreme gender dysphoria in childhood than children with desisting gender dysphoria. Some (but not all) gender variant youth will want or need to transition, which may involve social transition (changing dress, name, pronoun), and, for older youth and adolescents, medical transition (hormone therapy or surgery).

DSM-5 (2013)

In May 2013, the American Psychiatric Association published the DSM-5 update to the Diagnostic and Statistical Manual of Mental Disorders, in which the GIDC diagnosis was removed and replaced with gender dysphoria, for the first time in its own distinct chapter.  Subtyping by sexual orientation was deleted. The diagnosis for children was separated from that for adults. The creation of a specific diagnosis for children reflects the lesser ability of children to have insight into what they are experiencing, or ability to express it in the event that they have insight.

Signs and symptoms, as outlined by the DSM-5, include a marked incongruence between experienced/expressed gender and assigned gender, of at least six months duration, as manifested by at least six of the following (one of which must be criterion A1):

A strong desire to be of the other gender or an insistence that one is the other gender
A strong preference for wearing clothes typical of the opposite gender
A strong preference for cross-gender roles in make-believe play or fantasy play
A strong preference for the toys, games or activities stereotypically used or engaged in by the other gender
A strong preference for playmates of the other gender
A strong rejection of toys, games and activities typical of one's assigned gender
A strong dislike of one's sexual anatomy
A strong desire for the physical sex characteristics that match one's experienced gender

B. The condition is associated with clinically significant distress or impairment in social, school, or other important areas of functioning.

International Classification of Diseases (ICD)

The International Classification of Diseases (ICD-10) lists several disorders related to gender identity, including gender identity disorder of childhood (F64.2): Persistent and intense distress about one's assigned gender, manifested prior to puberty. The current edition has five different diagnoses for gender identity disorder, including one for when it manifests during childhood. The diagnoses of gender identity disorder is not given to intersex individuals (those born with "ambiguous" genitalia). Additionally, as with all psychological disorders, these symptoms must cause direct distress and an impairment of functioning of the individual exhibiting the symptoms.

F64.2 Gender identity disorder of childhood: A disorder, usually first manifest during early childhood (and always well before puberty), characterized by a persistent and intense distress about assigned sex, together with a desire to be (or insistence that one is) of the other sex. There is a persistent preoccupation with the dress and activities of the opposite sex and repudiation of the individual's own sex. The diagnosis requires a profound disturbance of the normal gender identity; mere tomboyishness in girls or girlish behavior in boys is not sufficient. Gender identity disorders in individuals who have reached or are entering puberty should not be classified here but in F66.0.

The ICD-11 significantly revises classification of gender identity-related conditions. Under "conditions related to sexual health", the ICD-11 lists "gender incongruence", which is coded into three conditions:

 Gender incongruence of adolescence or adulthood (HA60): replaces F64.0
 Gender incongruence of childhood (HA61): replaces F64.2
 Gender incongruence, unspecified (HA6Z): replaces F64.9

Persistence

According to the American Academy of Pediatrics, "by age four most children have a stable sense of their gender identity" and "research substantiates that children who are prepubertal and assert [a transgender or gender diverse identity] know their gender as clearly and as consistently as their developmentally equivalent peers who identify as cisgender and benefit from the same level of social acceptance".

If gender dysphoria persists during puberty, it is very likely permanent. For children with gender dysphoria, the period between 10 and 13 years is crucial with regard to long-term gender identity. Factors that are associated with gender dysphoria persisting through puberty include intensity of gender dysphoria, amount of cross-gendered behavior, and verbal identification with the desired/experienced gender (i.e. stating that they are a different gender rather than wish to be a different gender). 

Prospective studies have reported that gender dysphoria in children is more heavily linked to adult homosexuality than to an adult transgender identity, especially with regard to boys. The studies state that the majority of children diagnosed with gender dysphoria did not desire to be the other sex by puberty, with most growing up to identify as gay, lesbian, or bisexual, with or without therapeutic intervention. The studies have been used to argue for more caution or delays in socially or medically transitioning transgender youth.
 
The prospective studies have been criticized as irrelevant on the basis that they counted as 'desistance' cases where the child was simply gender-nonconforming rather than dysphoric and tracked diagnoses rather than gender identity or desire to transition, leading to inflation of the desistance statistics. The majority of desistance research relies on four studies published since 2008. While the subjects met the criteria for gender identity disorder as defined in the DSM-III or DSM-IV, many would not have met the updated criteria for gender dysphoria in the DSM-5, established in 2013, which unlike prior versions explicitly requires identification with a gender other than assigned at birth. In one study, 40% of those classified as "desisters" were subthreshold even for the DSM-IV criteria. The four studies all offered evidence that statement of transgender identity in childhood predicted transgender identity in adolescence andadulthood and the intensity of gender dysphoria in childhood likewise predicted its intensity later in life. The studies published from the 1960-1980's never used the term desistance, instead focusing on "gender-deviant behavior" - childhood femininity in people assigned male at birth - and how this more often predicts homosexuality rather than "transsexualism" in adulthood. Additionally, some of the research since 2000 and all the research prior has been criticized for citing studies that used conversion therapy: either discouraging social transition, explicitly trying to prevent or discourage the child from identifying as transgender as an adult by adulthood or adolescence, or actively employing techniques to limit there "gender-deviant" behavior. The term "desistance" itself has been criticized as pathologizing for its roots in criminal research and oppositional defiance disorder, where desistance is considered a positive outcome.

A systematic review of research relating to desistance was published in 2022. It found that desistance was poorly defined: studies sometimes didn't define it or equally defined it as desistance of transgender identity or desistance of gender dysphoria. They also found none of the definitions allowed for dynamic or nonbinary gender identities and the majority of articles published were editorial pieces. They stated the concept was based on biased research from the 1960-80s and poor quality research in the 2000s. They concluded there was a "dearth of high-quality hypothesis-driven research that currently exists" on the subject, and suggested that desistance should "be removed from clinical and research discourse to focus instead on supporting [transgender and gender-expansive] youth rather than attempting to predict their future gender identity." According to a review published in 2022 considering more recent studies, the majority of pre-pubertal children who socially transition persist in their identity in 5-to 7-year follow-ups.

Prevalence

According to a review published in 2020 relying on recent statistical surveys, 1.2% to 2.7% of children and adolescents identify as transgender. The data was drawn more from studies of adolescents than pre-pubertal youth and noted a difference in methodological quality between studies published before and after 2010. The review notes rising numbers of youth are self-identifying as trans and calls for more systematic studies and reviews in future.

Management

The WPATH Standards of Care and other therapeutic interventions do not seek to change a child's gender identity. Instead, clinicians advise children and their parents to avoid goals based on gender identity and to instead cope with the child's distress by embracing psychoeducation and to be supportive of their gender variant identity and behavior as it develops. A clinician may suggest that the parent be attentive, listen, and encourage an environment for the child to explore and express their identified gender identity, which may be termed the true gender. This can remove the stigma associated with their dysphoria, as well as the pressure to conform to a gender identity or role they do not identify with, which may be termed the false gender self. WPATH Standards of Care also recommend assessing and treating any co-existing mental health issues. By contrast, the majority of major medical associations define attempts to change an individual's gender identity or gender expression as conversion therapy.

Treatment may also take the form of puberty blockers (such as leuprorelin), cross-sex hormones (i.e., administering estrogen to a child assigned male at birth or testosterone to a child assigned female at birth), or sex reassignment surgery with the aim of bringing one's physical body in line with their identified gender. Delaying puberty allows for the child to mentally mature while preventing them from developing a body they may not want, so that they may hopefully make a more informed decision about their gender identity once they are an adolescent. It can also help reduce anxiety and depression. Short-term side effects of puberty blockers include headaches, fatigue, insomnia, muscle aches and changes in breast tissue, mood, and weight. Research on the long-term effects on brain development, cognitive function, fertility, and sexual function is limited.

According to the American Psychiatric Association, "Due to the dynamic nature of puberty development, lack of gender-affirming interventions (i.e. social, psychological,
and medical) is not a neutral decision; youth often experience worsening dysphoria and negative impact on mental health as the incongruent and unwanted puberty progresses. Trans-affirming treatment, such as the use of puberty suppression, is associated with the relief of emotional distress, and notable gains in psychosocial and emotional development, in trans and gender diverse youth".

In its position statement published December 2020, the Endocrine Society stated that there is durable evidence for a biological underpinning to gender identity and that pubertal suppression, hormone therapy, and medically indicated surgery are effective and relatively safe when monitored appropriately and have been established as the standard of care. They noted a decrease in suicidal ideation among youth who have access to gender-affirming care and comparable levels of depression to cisgender peers among socially transitioned pre-pubertal youth. In its 2017 guideline on treating those with gender dysphoria, it recommends puberty blockers be started when the child has started puberty (Tanner Stage 2 for breast or genital development) and cross-sex hormones be started at 16, though they note "there may be compelling reasons to initiate sex hormone treatment prior to the age of 16 years in some adolescents with GD/gender incongruence". They recommend a multidisciplinary team of medical and mental health professionals manage the treatment for those under 18. They also recommend "monitoring clinical pubertal development every 3 to 6 months and laboratory parameters every 6 to 12 months during sex hormone treatment".

For adolescents, WPATH says that physical interventions such as puberty blockers, hormone therapy, or surgery may be appropriate. Before any physical interventions are initiated, however, a psychiatric assessment exploring the psychological, family, and social issues around the adolescent's gender dysphoria should be undertaken. Some medical professionals disagree that adolescents are cognitively mature enough to make a decision with regard to hormone therapy or surgery, and advise that irreversible genital procedures should not be performed on individuals under the age of legal consent in their respective country. WPATH's Standards of Care 8, published in 2022, declare puberty blocking medication as "medically necessary", and recommends them for usage in transgender adolescents once the patient has reached Tanner stage 2 of development, and state that longitudinal shows improved outcomes for transgender patients who receive them.

While few studies have examined the effects of puberty blockers for gender non-conforming or transgender adolescents, the studies that have been conducted generally indicate that these treatments are reasonably safe, are reversible, and can improve psychological well-being in these individuals.

A 2020 review published in Child and Adolescent Mental Health found that puberty blockers are reversible and associated with such positive outcomes as decreased suicidality in adulthood, improved affect and psychological functioning, and improved social life. A 2020 survey published in Pediatrics found that puberty blockers are associated with better mental health outcomes and lower odds of lifetime suicidal ideation. A 2022 study published in the Journal of the American Medical Association found a 60% reduction in moderate and severe depression and a 73% reduction in suicidality among transgender youth aged 13–20 who took puberty blockers and gender-affirming hormones over a 12-month follow-up. A 2022 study published in The Lancet involving 720 transgender adolescents who took puberty blockers and hormones found that 98 percent continued to use hormones at a follow up appointment.

In 2020, a review article commissioned by NHS England was published by the National Institute for Health and Care Excellence, concluding that the quality of evidence for puberty blocker outcomes (for mental health, quality of life and impact on gender dysphoria) was of very low certainty based on the GRADE scale. The Finnish government commissioned a review of the research evidence for treatment of minors and the Finnish Ministry of Health concluded that there are no research-based health care methods for minors with gender dysphoria. Nevertheless, they recommend the use of puberty blockers for minors on a case-by-case basis, and the American Academy of Pediatrics state that "pubertal suppression in children who identify as TGD [transgender and gender diverse] generally leads to improved psychological functioning in adolescence and young adulthood."

In 2022, the National Board of Health and Welfare in Sweden issued new guidelines recommending that puberty blockers only be given in "exceptional cases" and said that their use was grounded in "uncertain science." Instead, they recommended child psychiatric treatment, psychosocial interventions, and suicide prevention measures to be offered by clinicians.

Data from the Tavistock clinic found that children who were given puberty blockers were very likely to transition, with 43/44 (98%) of children who were given puberty blockers ultimately going on to take cross-sex hormones.

History
Past attempts at therapeutic intervention often included conversion therapy, viewing gender non-conformity as a problem to be fixed rather than natural variation. In addition, gender identity, gender expression, and sexual orientation were often conflated as problems to be corrected and replaced with the "correct" gendered behavior. Noting that many transgender and homosexual adults reported gender-nonconformity in childhood, clinicians at the time viewed early childhood intervention as a way to prevent a later LGBT identification. Notable proponents of the view that a trans "outcome" should be discouraged have included Richard Green, John Money, George Rekers, Ole Ivar Lovaas, Kenneth Zucker and Susan Bradley.

The introduction of the GIDC diagnosis into the DSM-III in 1980 was preceded by numerous US studies and treatments on feminine boys beginning as early as the 1950s and 1960s, most prominently by John Money and Richard Green at the Johns Hopkins Hospital and the University of California, Los Angeles (UCLA). The prevention of transsexuality and / or homosexuality was explicitly stated as the goal of many of these studies: "My focus will be what we might consider the prevention of transsexualism." Bryant states that feminine boys were not a new phenomenon at this time; however, the public emergence of adult transsexual women (male to female) in the 1950s was new and created a number of problems for psychologists, motivating some to undertake efforts at preventing their further emergence. Meyerowitz chronicles the deep disagreements which erupted between psychologists and physicians after Christine Jorgensen's public gender transition, namely over whether transsexuals should be permitted to align their bodies with their inner identities or whether their inner identities must be brought in line with their bodies. At the time, transsexual women were beginning to publish first-person narratives which highlighted their awareness of their femininity at a young age and Bryant states that some clinicians and researchers thus turned their attention to feminine boys, constructing sissies as a new "medicalized patient and research population."

In 1960, Green and Money published a paper titled "Incongruous Gender Role: Nongenital Manifestations in Prepubertal Boys," detailing their observations of 5 children assigned male at birth(AMAB) who "showed incongruities in gender role", ranging from preferring to play with girls to praying God would change them into a girl. Citing that adult gay men and transgender women recollect gender incongruity in childhood, they later concluded 
early intervention is best in cases of gender incongruity and that "part of the successful rearing of a child is orienting him, from birth, to his biologically and culturally acceptable gender role. This, as far as we know, is best achieved by providing a relationship between husband and wife exemplifying these respective roles."

In 1968, Green published "Childhood Cross-Gender Identification", a paper reviewing the therapy of nine AMAB children who were younger than 8 and "clearly prepubertal". The first six were from the collaborative papers between Green and Money, the last 3 were from Robert Stoller. Citing the failure of attempts to "cure" adult trans women, he reported early diagnosis and treatment may be effective in preventing manifestations of adulthood cross-gender identification. The stated goals of family therapy are for "for the husband and wife to gain some perspective on the second class citizen of the husband and of the significance of their unbalanced roles in shaping their son's personality. Additional focus is on the masculinity-inhibiting of mother's anxiety over her son's healthy aggression and her greater comfort with what to her is his less threatening behavior."

Another early researcher was George Alan Rekers, who later became an administrator at NARTH, who focused his 1972 doctoral research on the treatment of feminine boys. In this work, Rekers describes a litany of feminine behaviours which he catalogues including: feminine posture, gait, arm and hand gestures, feminine inflection in speech, as well as interest in feminine clothing, games and conversation topics. Using classical behaviour modification techniques he and a team of research assistants set about extinguishing 'problem' feminine behaviours in three boys in particular, enlisting the help of parents and occasionally teachers to provide rewards and punishments corresponding to behaviours identified as wanted or unwanted. Rekers' dissertation describes in detail, the case of Kraig (a pseudonym for Kirk Andrew Murphy) whose mother was instructed over earphones to alternately praise or ignore him depending on whether he played with a table of toys deemed to be feminine (typically dolls) or masculine (typically weapons). She was also trained to monitor his behaviour at home, with research assistants visiting weekly to ensure she was correctly completing her four times daily observations of Kraig's gendered behaviour. Physical punishment from Kraig's father is named as one of the primary consequences for feminine behaviour at home. Throughout Rekers's future work, he cites his treatments with Kraig as a success, claiming that "Kraig's feminine behaviours have apparently ceased entirely […]."
 
In 1974, Rekers and Ole Ivar Lovaas published the article "Behavioral Treatment of Deviant Sex-Role Behaviors in a Male Child." The article cited Green and Money as a source of the "growing evidence that childhood cross-gender manifestations are indicative of later adult sexual abnormalities; e.g., transvestism, transsexualism, or some forms of homosexuality." It noted that many transgender women and gay men reported their "cross-gender behaviors began in early childhood" and the research showed it was difficult or impossible to shift in adults; the authors felt the best way to prevent "future sexual deviance", or at least make it unlikely as possible, was to correct gender noncomforming behavior at a young age. The method the paper detailed was a token based reinforcement system administered by the parents which rewarded gender conformity and punished deviancy. Blue chips were a sign of good behavior and could be swapped for chocolate bars, red chips were a sign of bad behavior and resulted in isolation and beatings.

In contrast to this, a number of facts about Kraig have become public information, including: that he was a gay man; that according to his family, he never recovered from these treatments; and that in 2003, at the age of 38, he committed suicide. Even without confirmed knowledge of such outcomes, by the mid-1970s Rekers's publications on his treatment modality were already attracting harsh criticism from scholarly and popular media sources, and Bryant speculates that this is one possible explanation for why many clinicians do not publish on their treatment techniques, focusing instead on less controversial aspects of GD, such as diagnostic criteria.

Therapeutic approaches for GD differ from those used on adults and have included behavior therapy, psychodynamic therapy, group therapy, and parent counseling. This includes aiming to reduce gender dysphoria, making children more comfortable with their bodies, lessening ostracism, and reducing the child's psychiatric comorbidity.

Therapeutic intervention seeks to identify and resolve underlying factors (including familial factors), encourage the child to identify with their assigned sex, and encourage same-sex friendships. Parent counseling involves setting limits on the child's cross-gender behavior, encouraging gender-neutral or sex-typical activities, examining familial factors, and examining parental factors such as psychopathology. Researchers Zucker and Susan Bradley state that it has been found that boys with GD often have mothers who, to an extent, reinforced behavior more stereotypical of young girls. They also state that children with GD tend to come from families where cross-gender role behavior was not explicitly discouraged. However, they also acknowledge that one could view these findings as merely indicative of the fact that parents who were more accepting of their child's cross-gender role behavior are also more likely to bring their children to a clinical psychiatrist as opposed to parents who are less accepting of cross-gender role behavior in their children.

In 2002, Zucker acknowledged limited data on gender dysphoria in children, stating that "apart from a series of intrasubject behaviour therapy case reports from the 1970s, one will find not a single randomized controlled treatment trial in the literature". He has stated that "the therapist must rely on the 'clinical wisdom' that has accumulated and to utilize largely untested case formulation conceptual models to inform treatment approaches and decisions." In 2018, in a narrative systemic review titled "Conversion therapies and access to transition-related healthcare in transgender people", Zucker's work was provided as a case study in conversion therapy including open-ended play psychotherapy, parent counselling, and parent-guided interventions to prevent "transsexualism". The study was criticized by the reviewers for relying on flawed estimates of desistance as well as actively trying to reduce cross-gender identification.

In 2015, the American Psychological Association and the Substance Abuse and Mental Health Services Administration collaborated on a report stating "conversion therapy—efforts to change an individual's sexual orientation, gender identity, or gender expression—is a practice that is not supported by credible evidence and has been disavowed by behavioral health experts and associations. Conversion therapy perpetuates outdated views of gender roles and identities as well as the negative stereotype that being a sexual or gender minority or identifying as LGBTQ is an abnormal aspect of human development. Most importantly, it may put young people at risk of serious harm." Already by 2017, the majority of major medical associations had defined attempts to change an individual's gender identity or gender expression as conversion therapy.

In 2021, the World Professional Association for Transgender Health concluded that treatment aimed at trying to change a person's gender identity and expression to become more congruent with sex assigned at birth "is no longer considered ethical." Edgardo Menvielle, a child-adolescent psychiatrist at the Children's National Medical Center in Washington advised that "Therapists who advocate changing gender variant behaviours should be avoided." Developmental and clinical psychologist Diane Ehrensaft told the Psychiatric Times, "The mental health profession has been consistently doing harm to children who are not 'gender normal,' and they need to retrain."

Society and culture

Diagnostic dispute
Pickstone-Taylor has called Zucker and Bradley's therapeutic intervention "something disturbingly close to reparative therapy for homosexuals." Other academics, such as Maddux et al., have also compared it to such therapy. They argue that the goal is preventing a transgender identity because reparative therapy is believed to reduce the chances of adult GD, "which Zucker and Bradley characterize as undesirable."

Author Phyllis Burke wrote, "The diagnosis of GID in children, as supported by Zucker and Bradley, is simply child abuse." Zucker dismisses Burke's book as "simplistic" and "not particularly illuminating;" and journalist Stephanie Wilkinson said Zucker characterized Burke's book as "the work of a journalist whose views shouldn't be put into the same camp as those of scientists like Richard Green or himself."

Critics argue that the GIDC diagnosis was a backdoor maneuver to replace homosexuality in the DSM; Zucker and Robert Spitzer counter that the GIDC inclusion was based on "expert consensus," which is "the same mechanism that led to the introduction of many new psychiatric diagnoses, including those for which systematic field trials were not available when the DSM-III was published." Katherine Wilson of GID Reform Advocates stated:

In the case of gender non-conforming children and adolescents, the GID criteria are significantly broader in scope in the DSM-IV (APA, 1994, p. 537) than in earlier revisions, to the concern of many civil libertarians. A child may be diagnosed with Gender Identity Disorder without ever having stated any desire to be, or insistence of being, the other sex. Boys are inexplicably held to a much stricter standard of conformity than girls. Most psychologists who specialize in gender identity disorder in children note a higher level of male patients brought to them, rather than female patients. A possible explanation would be that cross-sex behavior is less acceptable and therefore more noticeable and more likely to be viewed as problematic by the child's parents (Bradley, Zucker, 1997). Preference for cross-dressing or simulating female attire meets the diagnostic criterion for boys but not for girls, who must insist on wearing only male clothing to merit diagnosis. References to "stereotypical" clothing, toys and activities of the other sex are imprecise in an American culture where much children's clothing is unisex and appropriate sex role is the subject of political debate. Equally puzzling is a criterion which lists a "strong preference for playmates of the other sex" as symptomatic, and seems to equate mental health with sexual discrimination and segregation.

Some clinicians, such as Wilson et al., argue that GIDC "has served to pressurize boys to conform to traditional gender and heterosexual roles." Feder states that the diagnosis is based on the reactions of others to the child, not the behavior itself. Langer et al. state "Gender atypicality is a social construction that varies over time according to culture and social class and therefore should not be pathologized." Zucker refuted their claims in a response.  Psychiatrist Domenico Di Ceglie opined that for therapeutic intervention, "efficacy is unclear," and psychologist Bernadette Wren says, "There is little evidence, however, that any psychological treatments have much effect in changing gender identity although some treatment centres continue to promote this as an aim (e.g. Zucker, & Bradley, 1995)."

Therapeutic intervention for GIDC came under renewed scrutiny in May 2008, when Kenneth Zucker was appointed to the DSM-5 committee on GIDC.  According to MSNBC, "The petition accuses Zucker of having engaged in 'junk science' and promoting 'hurtful theories' during his career." Zucker is accused by LGBT activists of promoting "gender-conforming therapies in children" and "treating children with GID with an eye toward preventing adult homosexuality or transsexuality." Zucker "rejects the junk-science charge, saying that there 'has to be an empirical basis to modify anything' in the DSM. As for hurting people, 'in my own career, my primary motivation in working with children, adolescents and families is to help them with the distress and suffering they are experiencing, whatever the reasons they are having these struggles. I want to help people feel better about themselves, not hurt them.'" However, opponents continue to argue that the diagnosis "harms the very children it purports to help".

The DSM-5 change to "gender dysphoria" was endorsed by transgender activists and allies as a way to lessen stigma but maintain a diagnostic route to trans-specific medical care. However, Lev states that the diagnosis of gender dysphoria continues to pathologize transgender experiences.

Current views
Referencing contemporary Western views on gender diversity, psychologist Diane Ehrensaft stated: "I am witnessing a shake-up in the mental health community as training sessions, workshops and conferences are proliferating all over this country and around the world, demanding that we reevaluate the binary system of gender, throw out the idea that gender nonconformity is a disorder, and establish new guidelines for facilitating the healthy development of gender-creative children." Child-adolescent psychiatrist Edgardo Menvielle and psychotherapist Catherine Tuerck offer a support group for parents of gender non-conforming children at the Children's National Medical Center in Washington D.C., aimed "not at changing children's behaviours but at helping parents to be supportive". Other publications began to call for a similar approach, to support parents to help their child become their authentic self.

Community organizations established to support these families have begun to develop, all with the goal of supporting healthy families with gender non conforming or transgender children. Popular media accounts of parents assisting their children to live in their felt gender role have also emerged. Menvielle maintains that "the therapist should focus on helping the child and family cope with intolerance and social prejudice, not on the child's behaviours, interests or choice of playmates". A host of additional terms have been applied to these children, including gender variant, gender non-conforming, and gender-creative.

See also

Childhood gender nonconformity
Transgender youth
List of transgender-related topics

References

External links 

Gender Dysphoria and Transsexualism  via Merck Manual
More Children Seek Help for Gender Dysphoria via WebMD.com
Health Effects Of Transitioning In Teen Years Remain Unknown via NPR
When Transgender Kids Transition, Medical Risks are Both Known and Unknown via Frontline PBS
Parents of transgender children are faced with a difficult decision via NYMag.com
The boy who was raised a girl via BBC
Led by the child who simply knew The twin boys were identical in every way but one. via Boston.com
A nonprofit program serving transgender and gender-variant youth and their families. via Camp Aranutiq
As Attention Grows, Transgender Children's Numbers Are Elusive via The New York Times
First U.S. Study of Transgender Youth Funded by NIH via University of California, San Francisco
Where Transgender Is No Longer a Diagnosis via Scientific American

Gender identity
Mental disorders diagnosed in childhood
Transgender and medicine